Norton Folgate or Liberty of Norton Folgate may refer to:
 Norton Folgate, a street in central London
 Liberty of Norton Folgate, an ancient administrative area in central London
 The Liberty of Norton Folgate, a music album by the British ska band Madness; a song in that album